Morefield is an unincorporated community in central Minnehaha County in Sverdrup Township, South Dakota, United States.

History
Founded in 1902, Morefield was a busy country community center. Morefield was named by Norwegian settlers for a Norwegian word, Meråker, which means more field.

External links
 Images and history texts of Morefield

Unincorporated communities in Minnehaha County, South Dakota
Unincorporated communities in South Dakota
Sioux Falls, South Dakota metropolitan area